Kabyai Creek or Kaibai Creek is a tributary of the McCloud River in Shasta County, California. It flows into the river opposite the McCloud Bridge Campground in the Shasta–Trinity National Forest.

History
The mouth of Kabyai Creek, was the site of a Winnemem Wintu village, that suffered an attack by a party of white settlers, the Kabyai Creek Massacre on August 17, 1854. The burial site of the massacre is among those of the Winnemem Wintu being threatened with being submerged by Shasta Lake if the proposed raising of Shasta Dam occurs.

References 

Rivers of Shasta County, California
Shasta-Trinity National Forest
Tributaries of the Sacramento River
Rivers of Northern California